Traun is a city in Austria.

Traun may also refer to:

Traun (river), a tributary to the Danube in Austria
Traun (Alz), a tributary to the Alz river in Bavaria

See also
Abensberg-Traun, Austrian noble family
Otto Ferdinand von Abensperg und Traun (1677–1748), Austrian aristocrat